Class U: Military Science is a classification used by the Library of Congress Classification system. This page outlines the sub-classes of Class U.

U - Military science (general) 

21‑22.3.....................................War. Philosophy. Military sociology
27‑43........................................History of military science
45.............................................Historiography
56‑59........................................Army clubs
150‑155.....................................Military planning
161‑163.....................................Strategy
164‑167.5..................................Tactics
168...........................................Logistics
250‑255.....................................Maneuvers (combined arms)
260...........................................Joint operations. Combined operations
261...........................................Amphibious warfare
262...........................................Commando tactics
263‑264.5..................................Atomic warfare. Atomic weapons
300‑305.....................................Artillery and rifle ranges
310‑310.2..................................War games
320‑325.....................................Physical training of soldiers
400‑714.....................................Military education and training
750‑773.....................................Military life, manners and customs, antiquities, etc.
799‑897.....................................History of arms and armor

UA - Armies: Organization, distribution, military situation 

21‑885.....................................By region or country
910‑915...................................Mobilization
920‑925...................................Plans for attack and defense
926‑929...................................Civil defense
929.5‑929.95...........................War damage in industry. Industrial defense
940‑945...................................Military communication
950‑979...................................Routes of travel. Distances
985‑997...................................Military geography

UB - Military administration

160‑165...................................Records, returns, muster rolls, etc.
170‑175...................................Adjutant generals' offices
180‑197...................................Civilian personnel departments
250‑271...................................Intelligence
273‑274...................................Sabotage
275‑277...................................Psychological warfare. Propaganda
320‑338...................................Enlistment, recruiting, etc.
340‑345...................................Compulsory service. Conscription and exemption
356‑369.5................................Provision for veterans
370‑375...................................Military pensions, etc.
380‑385...................................Soldiers' and sailors' homes
407‑409...................................Warrant officers. Noncommissioned officers
410‑415...................................Officers
416‑419...................................Minorities, women, etc. in armed forces
420‑425...................................Furloughs
440‑449.5................................Retired military personnel

UC - Maintenance and transportation 

20‑258.....................................Organization of the service. By region or country
260‑267...................................Supplies and stores
270‑360...................................Transportation
400‑440...................................Barracks. Quarters. Camps
460‑535...................................Clothing and equipment
540‑585...................................Equipage. Field kits
600‑695...................................Horses. Mules. Remount service
700‑780...................................Subsistence

UD - Infantry 

157‑302...................................Tactics. Maneuvers. Drill regulations
320‑325...................................Manual of arms
330‑335...................................Firing. Military sharpshooting
340‑345...................................Bayonet drill
380‑425...................................Small arms. Swords, etc.
450‑455...................................Mounted infantry
460‑464...................................Mountain troops
470‑475...................................Ski troops
480‑485...................................Airborne troops. Parachute troops
490‑495...................................Airmobile operations

UE - Cavalry. Armour 

144‑145...................................Horse cavalry
147..........................................Armored cavalry
157‑302...................................Tactics. Maneuvers. Drill regulations
420‑425...................................Cavalry sword exercises
460‑475...................................Horses

UF - Artillery 

157‑302...................................Tactics. Maneuvers. Drill regulations
400‑405...................................Field artillery
450‑455...................................Seacoast artillery
460‑465...................................Siege artillery
470‑475...................................Howitzer artillery. Mortar batteries
480‑485...................................Garrison artillery
500‑515...................................Weapons systems
520‑537...................................Ordnance and small arms
540‑545...................................Arsenals, magazines, armories, etc.
560‑780...................................Ordnance material (Ordnance proper)
820‑830...................................Ballistics. Velocities and motions of projectiles
848‑856...................................Artillery instruments. Fire control, etc.

UG - Military engineering. Air forces 

1‑620................................Military engineering
160‑302..................................Tactics and regulations
335.........................................Bridges
340.........................................Tunnels
360‑390..................................Field engineering
400‑442..................................Fortification
443‑449..................................Attack and defense. Siege warfare
470‑474.................................Military surveying, topography, and..mapping
490.........................................Land mines, etc.
500‑565..................................Technical troops and other special corps
570‑582..................................Military signaling
590‑613.5...............................Military telegraphy and telephony
614‑614.5...............................Military electric lighting
615‑620..................................Military motor vehicles
622‑1435...........................Air forces. Air warfare
633‑635..................................By region or country
637‑639..................................Education and training
640‑645..................................Military aeronautical research
700‑705..................................Tactics
730‑735..................................Air defenses
760‑765..................................Aerial reconnaissance
770‑1045................................Organization. Personnel management
1097.......................................Air bases
1100‑1435...............................Equipment and supplies
1500‑1530.........................Military astronautics. Space warfare. Space surveillance
1523‑1525...............................By region or country

UH - Other services 

20‑25......................................Chaplains
201‑515...................................Medical and sanitary services
520‑(560)................................Care of sick and wounded. Relief societies
600‑629.5................................Military hygiene and sanitation
700‑705...................................Public relations. Press. War correspondents
750‑769...................................Military social work. Social welfare services
800‑910...................................Recreation and information services

References

Further reading 
 Full schedule of all LCC Classifications
 List of all LCC Classification Outlines

U